In mathematics, Hermite numbers are values of Hermite polynomials at zero argument. Typically they are defined for physicists' Hermite polynomials.

Formal definition
The numbers Hn = Hn(0), where Hn(x) is a Hermite polynomial of order n, may be called Hermite numbers. 

The first Hermite numbers are:

Recursion relations
Are obtained from recursion relations of Hermitian polynomials for x = 0:

Since H0 = 1 and H1 = 0 one can construct a closed formula for Hn:

where (n - 1)!! = 1 × 3 × ... × (n - 1).

Usage
From the generating function of Hermitian polynomials it follows that 

Reference  gives a formal power series:

where formally the n-th power of H,  Hn, is the n-th Hermite number, Hn.  (See Umbral calculus.)

Notes

Integer sequences